Martin Allikvee (born 21 March 1995) is an Estonian swimmer. He is a one-time Olympian, a multiple-time Estonian record holder in the men's breaststroke. He competed in the men's 200 metre breaststroke event at the 2016 Summer Olympics. He is 18-time long course and 25-time short course Estonian swimming champion. He has broken 9 Estonian records in swimming.

Announced the end of his sports career in 2021.
60 times Estonian champion, 17 Estonian records.
Two times Olympic Swimmer - (2016 Rio de Janeiro and 2020 Tokyo)
Two-times finalist of the European Championship: (2017 and 2019)
Multiple participant of the world championships (2014-2020)

See also
 List of Estonian records in swimming

References

External links
 Martin Allikvee at ESBL.ee
 

1995 births
Living people
Estonian male breaststroke swimmers
Olympic swimmers of Estonia
Swimmers at the 2016 Summer Olympics
Swimmers at the 2020 Summer Olympics
Swimmers from Tallinn
21st-century Estonian people
Estonian swimming coaches